Arthur Li (born 24 August 1972) is a Hong Kong butterfly, freestyle and medley swimmer. He competed at the 1988, 1992 and the 1996 Summer Olympics.

References

External links
 

1972 births
Living people
Hong Kong male butterfly swimmers
Hong Kong male freestyle swimmers
Hong Kong male medley swimmers
Olympic swimmers of Hong Kong
Swimmers at the 1988 Summer Olympics
Swimmers at the 1992 Summer Olympics
Swimmers at the 1996 Summer Olympics
Commonwealth Games competitors for Hong Kong
Swimmers at the 1990 Commonwealth Games
Swimmers at the 1994 Commonwealth Games
Place of birth missing (living people)
Swimmers at the 1994 Asian Games
Swimmers at the 1998 Asian Games
Asian Games competitors for Hong Kong